C. amseli may refer to:

 Caradrina amseli, an owlet moth
 Cnephasia amseli, a tortrix moth
 Coleophora amseli, a case moth
 Crambus amseli, a grass moth
 Cryphia amseli, an owlet moth